The 2009 FIA European Truck Racing Championship was a multi-event motor racing championship for production based trucks held across Europe. The championship features a mix of professional motor racing teams and privately funded amateur drivers competing in highly modified versions of two-axle tractor units which conform to the technical regulations for the championship. It was the 25th European Truck Racing Championship season and began at Assen on May 10, with the finale at Jarama on October 4 after nine events. The championship was won by David Vršecký, taking his second title in a row.

Teams and drivers

Race drivers without fixed number, whose number is defined race by race:

Calendar and winners

Championship standings

Drivers' Championship

Each round or racing event consisted of four races. At the races 1 and 3, the points awarded according to the ranking was on a 20, 15, 12, 10, 8, 6, 4, 3, 2, 1 basis to the top 10 finishers – at the races 2 and 4 with reversed grid, the points awarded were 10, 9, 8, 7, 6, 5, 4, 3, 2, 1  (rank 1 - 10) respectively.

Source of information:

Teams' Championship

Source of information:

References

External links 

Truck Race Organization
TruckRacing.de 

European Truck Racing Championship seasons
European Truck Racing Championship
Truck Racing Championship